The following are the Pulitzer Prizes for 1986.

Journalism
Public service: The Denver Post
"For its in-depth study of "missing children", which revealed that most are involved in custody disputes or are runaways  and which helped mitigate national fears stirred by exaggerated statistics."
General news reporting: Edna Buchanan of The Miami Herald
"For her versatile and consistently excellent police beat reporting."
Investigative reporting: Jeffrey A. Marx and Michael M. York of the Lexington Herald Leader
"For their series "Playing Above the Rules," which exposed cash payoffs to University of Kentucky basketball players in violation of NCAA regulations and led to significant reforms.."
Explanatory reporting: Staff of The New York Times
"For a six-part comprehensive series on the Strategic Defense Initiative, which explored the scientific, political and foreign policy issues involved in 'Star Wars'."
Specialized Reporting: Andrew Schneider and Mary Pat Flaherty of the Pittsburgh Press
"For their investigation of violations and failures in the organ transplantation system in the United States."
National reporting: Craig Flournoy and George Rodrigue of The Dallas Morning News
"For their investigation into subsidized housing in East Texas, which uncovered patterns of racial discrimination and segregation in public housing across the United States and led to significant reforms."
National reporting: Arthur Howe of The Philadelphia Inquirer
"For his enterprising and indefatigable reporting on massive deficiencies in IRS processing of tax returns-reporting that eventually inspired major changes in IRS procedures and prompted the agency to make a public apology to U.S. taxpayers."
International reporting: Lewis M. Simons, Pete Carey and Katherine Ellison of the San Jose Mercury News
"For their June 1985 series that documented massive transfers of wealth abroad by President Marcos and his associates and had a direct impact on subsequent political developments in the Philippines and the United States."
Feature writing: John Camp of St. Paul Pioneer Press and Dispatch
"For his five-part series examining the life of an American farm family faced with the worst U.S. agricultural crisis since the Depression."
Commentary: Jimmy Breslin of the New York Daily News
"For columns which consistently champion ordinary citizens"
Criticism: Donal Henahan of The New York Times
"For his music criticism."
Editorial writing: Jack Fuller of the Chicago Tribune
"For his editorials on constitutional issues."
Editorial cartooning: Jules Feiffer of The Village Voice, New York City
Spot news photography: Carol Guzy and Michel duCille of The Miami Herald
"For their photographs of the devastation caused by the eruption of the Nevado del Ruiz volcano in Colombia."
Feature photography: Tom Gralish of The Philadelphia Inquirer
"For his series of photographs of Philadelphia's homeless."

Letters and Drama
 Fiction: Lonesome Dove by Larry McMurtry (Simon & Schuster)
 History: ...the Heavens and the Earth: A Political History of the Space Age by Walter A. McDougall (Basic Books)
 Biography or autobiography: Louise Bogan: A Portrait by Elizabeth Frank (Alfred A. Knopf)
 Poetry: The Flying Change by Henry Taylor (Louisiana State University Press)
 General non-fiction: Common Ground: A Turbulent Decade in the Lives of Three American Families by J. Anthony Lukas (Alfred A. Knopf)
 General non-fiction: Move Your Shadow: South Africa, Black and White by Joseph Lelyveld (Times Books)
 Music: Wind Quintet No. 4 by George Perle (Galaxy Music)Premiered on October 2, 1985

References

External links
 

Pulitzer Prizes by year
Pulitzer Prize
Pulitzer Prize